FanFiction.Net (often abbreviated as FF.net or FFN) is an automated fan fiction archive site. It was founded on October 15, 1998, by Los Angeles computer programmer Xing Li, who also runs the site. It has over 12 million registered users and hosts stories in over 40 languages.

The site is split into many main categories: Anime/Manga, Books, Cartoons, Games, Comics, Movies, Plays/Musicals, TV shows, and Miscellaneous. The site also includes the Crossover category, added on March 27, 2009. Users who complete the free registration process can submit their fan fiction, maintain a user profile, review other stories, apply for a beta reader position, contact each other via private messages, and maintain a list of favorite stories and authors. There are centralized communities and forums. In lieu of signing up with a new account, the website allows users to use their Google, Facebook, or Twitter accounts. The site also owns a Twitter account called FictionPress where users of the website are updated on changes and improvements made.

Creation
In 1998, Xing Li, a software designer, created FanFiction.Net. The site was created as a repository for fan-created stories that revolved around characters from popular literature, television, comics, or real-world celebrities. Unlike other fan fiction sites, FanFiction.Net allowed stories about any characters rather than revolving around a specific set of characters, such as those from Naruto, Twilight, or Kingdom Hearts. Registration was open to all people who claimed to be over 18, and by 2002 over 118,000 people were registered. (The age limit has since been moved down to 13.) At that time, one-third of the registrants self-identified as 18 or younger, and 80% were female.

Site content
, FanFiction.Net has had a total of just over 14 million stories published. The stories published to the site can be about new and old existing works. By 2001, almost 100,000 stories were posted on the website. Steven Savage, a programmer who operated a column on FanFiction.Net, described it as "the adult version of when kids play at being TV characters" and that the content posted on the website serves as examples for "when people really care about something". A. S. Berman of USA Today said in 2001 that FanFiction.Net "reads like the 21st century successor to the poetry slams of the Beat Generation".

Story publishing
FanFiction.Net has nine categories for the various fandoms/sub-categories on the site: Anime/Manga, Books, Cartoons, Comics, Games, Miscellaneous, Movies, Plays/Musicals, and TV shows. Stories on the site can be published as either "Fanfiction" with only one assigned sub-category, or as a "Crossover" with only two sub-categories. Excluding crossovers, the top fandoms on the site are Harry Potter, Naruto, and Twilight. 

Writers may upload their stories to the site and must assign them a sub-category, language, and content rating. FanFiction.Net uses the content rating system from FictionRatings.com. This system contains the ratings of K, K+, T, M and MA. The MA rating and explicit violent and/or sexual themes are forbidden. The ratings are no longer done on the MPAA system, due to cease-and-desist demands from the Motion Picture Association of America in 2005. A list of explanations for the rating system currently employed is available from the drop-down rating menu in each of the individual archives on the site. The MA (18+) rating is not permitted on this site. A short K-rated summary is also required for a story to be published. While not required, the website recommends authors upload a cover image to their story.

Reader feedback
Readers can interact with the FanFiction.Net content in various ways. If the reader likes a story and/or its author, they can favorite both the story and its author.<ref name="Following and Favoriting explanation" Favorites are similar to likes, hearts or Archive of Our Own's kudos. Favorite stories and authors are displayed on a user's public profile page at the very bottom. A reader can also follow a story and/or its author. When a reader follows a story, they receive email notifications whenever that story is updated. When a reader follows an author, they receive email updates whenever the author updates any of their stories or publishes a new one. Readers can also leave reviews after reading stories, most of which are positive. While reviews can be left by those without accounts, it is an option for all writers on the site to moderate "anonymous reviews", made by those who are not signed into an account. FanFiction.Net does not operate a screening or editorial board.

Most popular sections 
As of October 8, 2022, the top 20 fandoms (i.e., the fandoms with the most stories submitted) on FanFiction.Net are (the figures are rounded to nearest thousand):

The top fandom for each category on the site are:

Notable long fan fiction works
FanFiction.Net also hosts one of the longest works of fiction ever written. The Subspace Emissary's Worlds Conquest, a Super Smash Bros. fan fiction written by FanFiction.Net user AuraChannelerChris, gained media attention for its length of over four million words at the time of notice, more than three times as long as In Search of Lost Time written by Marcel Proust, and is still being written. The longest fan fiction on the site is The Loud House: Revamped, an ongoing crossover fan fiction of The Loud House which has been over 16,750,000 words long since around 2020. However, the exact current word count of The Loud House: Revamped, is unknown as it surpassed the word count limit of the site of 16,777,215 words as the site uses 24-bit integers. It is also currently over 2000 chapters long.

Disallowed fan fiction

Copyright and trademark issues
FanFiction.Net instituted several policy changes as it grew in size and popularity. These policies frequently led to the deletion of fan fiction based on the copyrighted works of certain published authors or containing specifically targeted content.

Since the site's founding, several professional authors and producers have asked that stories based on their copyrighted or trademarked works be removed, including Anne Rice, P. N. Elrod, Archie Comics, Dennis L. McKiernan, Irene Radford, J.R. Ward, Laurell K. Hamilton, Nora Roberts/J.D. Robb, Raymond Feist, Robin Hobb, Robin McKinley, and Terry Goodkind.

In addition, stories based on real-life celebrities were disallowed around 2003. Fan fiction based on professional wrestling, however, is still allowed, being the number one fandom in the "Miscellaneous" category.

NC-17 ratings
On September 12, 2002, FanFiction.Net banned and removed material that was rated NC-17. Prior to the new policy, the site would use a pop-up to prompt readers to say whether they were over 17 or not, but since then, the site has relied on its users to report stories that are inappropriately rated. Some NC-17 material was moved to Adult-FanFiction.org (previously AdultFanFiction.Net), a similar site which was created to serve the adults who write R and NC-17 rated fan fiction. However, many stories containing explicit material still exist and have yet to be removed.

Story titles and summaries must be rated K.

CYOA (choose-your-own-adventure) or reader-insertion fiction
Choose-your-own-adventure and reader-insertion fanfiction have both been banned since 2005, and the site removed all material that had the potential of inserting the reader into a fanfiction. Under the heading of "Entries not allowed", item #5 says: "Any form of interactive entry: choose your adventure, second person/you based, Q&As, etc."

Songfics
In 2005, FanFiction.Net banned songfics which contain copyrighted lyrics. Public domain lyrics (such as those to "Amazing Grace") or lyrics written by the author of the fan fiction are allowed, however.

Lists
Until April 21, 2002, in addition to fiction stories based on existing characters, the site had a section devoted to lists, generally humor-related, for example "20 Ways to Dump Your Girlfriend".

Globalization
At first, FanFiction.Net's server was accessible mainly only in the West; and worked poorly, if at all, in other parts of the world. In late 2006, announcements were made of special web links designed for Europe and Asia. These were supposed to give other areas of the world a significant boost in server speed on the website. In 2007, all three web links were combined under one worldwide link. In an announcement on the home page, it was stated that the site would go global that year.

Prior to the reorganizations of 2002, FanFiction.Net contained approximately 20% of English-language fan fiction.

According to Hitwise, as of August 2007 FanFiction.Net comprised 34.7% of all traffic directed to sites in the Entertainment, Books and Writing category.

Archiving 
FanFiction.Net is a widely popular site for text-only content that can be deleted at any time by either the author of the story or the site administration. Because of these factors the website has attracted a wide array of archival projects to save these works, though most are not widely known. Large-scale projects include the ff2ebook project, fichub, and an independent project hosted on archive.org.

FictionPress.com

FanFiction.Net's sister site, FictionPress.com, contains over 1 million original stories, poems, and plays. The site has a similar format and rules to FanFiction.Net, except that no fan fiction is allowed. Currently, there are more poems than prose.

See also

Wattpad, a website and app offering similar features
Archive of Our Own (Organization for Transformative Works), another website offering similar features

References

External links

 
 FictionPress.com (Mobile)

Ebook sources
Fan fiction
Internet properties established in 1998
1998 establishments in California